Promyllantor purpureus is an eel in the family Congridae (conger/garden eels). It was described by Alfred William Alcock in 1890. It is a marine, deep water-dwelling eel which is known from the Indo-Western Pacific, including India and Indonesia.

References

Congridae
Fish described in 1890